Brzydowo  is a village in the administrative district of Gmina Świątki, within Olsztyn County, Warmian-Masurian Voivodeship, in northern Poland.

The village has a population of 442.

References

Brzydowo